Neil MacLeod (born 15 January 1960) is a former Australian rules footballer who played for Fitzroy and St Kilda in the Victorian Football League (VFL).

MacLeod, a rover, made his league debut at the age of 17, in the opening round of the 1977 VFL season. He ended up at St Kilda in 1980 and appeared in four games.

Sandringham secured his services in 1981, where he played until 1988 after amassing 87 games and kicking 167 goals. He was a member of Sandringham's premiership team in 1985 and also won the J. J. Liston Trophy that year.

References

Holmesby, Russell and Main, Jim (2007). The Encyclopedia of AFL Footballers. 7th ed. Melbourne: Bas Publishing.

1960 births
Living people
Fitzroy Football Club players
St Kilda Football Club players
Sandringham Football Club players
J. J. Liston Trophy winners
Australian players of Australian rules football